Martinengo is a comune (municipality) in the Province of Bergamo in the Italian region of Lombardy, located about  east of Milan and about  southeast of Bergamo.

The municipality of Martinengo contains the frazione (subdivision) Cortenuova di Sopra.

Martinengo borders the municipalities of Cividate al Piano, Cologno al Serio, Cortenuova, Ghisalba, Morengo, Mornico al Serio, Palosco, and Romano di Lombardia.

The municipality is home to the mother house of the Congregation of the Holy Family of Bergamo.

Demographic evolution

References

External links 
 www.comune.martinengo.bg.it/